Sajid Ali may refer to:
 Sajid Ali (cricketer), Pakistani cricketer
 Sajid Ali (cricketer, born 1979), Pakistani cricketer
 Sajid Ali (composer), Indian composer
 Sajid Ali Banbhan, Pakistani politician

Other
 Sajjad Ali